Mike Cuenca (born September 29, 1983) is a Cuban-American film director, producer, screenwriter, editor and musician. He was born in Westminster, California. He began directing in 2008 and has worked on feature films, shorts and music videos.

Filmography

Film

Shorts

Music Videos

References

External links 

 
 

1983 births
American film directors
American music video directors
American people of Cuban descent
Living people